The Greenhouse Gases Observing Satellite-2 (GOSAT-2), also known as , is an Earth observation satellite dedicated to greenhouse gas monitoring.  It is a successor of Greenhouse Gases Observing Satellite (GOSAT).  The GOSAT-2 was developed as a joint project of the Japan Aerospace Exploration Agency (JAXA), Ministry of the Environment, and the National Institute for Environmental Studies (NIES).  It was launched on 29 October 2018 from the Tanegashima Space Center aboard the H-IIA rocket.

Comparison to GOSAT

Major changes in comparison to the previous GOSAT are:
 Improved measurement precision.
 FTS-2 can also monitor carbon monoxide (CO) and nitrogen dioxide (NO2).
 FTS-2 can select cloud-free point automatically for observation.
 While GOSAT's CAI was observing nadir view, GOSAT-2's CAI-2 observes forward (20 degree) and backward (20 degree) simultaneously.
 CAI-2 can also monitor PM2.5 and black carbon.

Successor: GOSAT-GW 
GOSAT-GW is currently being developed for launch in 2023.

References

External links 
 GOSAT-2 site by JAXA
 GOSAT site by NIES
 GOSAT-2 site by NIES

Earth observation satellites of Japan
JAXA

Spacecraft launched by H-II rockets
Spacecraft launched in 2018